Santiago Magill Moreno (born 17 January 1977 in Lima, Peru) is a Peruvian actor who acts in soap-opera, TV series and films.

Selected filmography

Malicia (1995) (TV series)
Obsesión (1996) (TV series).... Domingo 'Mingo' Balarezo
Torbellino (1997) (TV series).... Herman
Boulevard Torbellino (1997) (TV series)
Luz María (1998) (TV series).... Christian
No se lo digas a nadie (1998)... aka Don't Tell Anyone .... Joaquín Camino
Isabella (1999) (telenovela)... aka Isabella: Mujer enamorada....Augusto Calderón
Pobre diabla (2000) (telenovela).... Christian Mejía Guzmán
Ciudad de M (2000)... aka City of M .... M
Before Night Falls... aka Antes que anochezca  (2000).... Tomás Diego
I Love You Baby (2001).... Daniel
Vale todo (2002) (TV series).... Santiago
Amiga (2003).... Mariano
Eva del Edén (2004) (TV series)
Corazón voyeur (2005)

References

Male actors from Lima
Peruvian male film actors
Peruvian male telenovela actors
Peruvian male television actors
1977 births
Living people
20th-century Peruvian male actors
21st-century Peruvian male actors